"Sincerely Yours/Can You Feel the Power of Words?" (stylized as "Sincerely Yours/Can you feel the POWER OF WORDS?") is a double-A side single by Japanese singer-songwriter Rina Aiuchi. It was released on 1 August 2002 through Giza Studio. "Sincerely Yours" was released as the first single from her third studio album A.I.R. while "Can You Feel the Power of Words?" was released as the sixth single from her second studio album Power of Words. Both songs served as the theme song to the Japanese television show The Letters ~ Kazoku no Ai ni Arigato. The single reached number four in Japan and has sold over 81,910 copies nationwide.

Track listing

Charts

Certification and sales

|-
! scope="row"| Japan (RIAJ)
| 
| 81,910
|-
|}

Release history

References

2002 singles
2002 songs
J-pop songs
Songs written by Aika Ohno
Song recordings produced by Daiko Nagato